The Kharkiv Ukrainian Drama Theatre also known as the Taras Shevchenko Kharkiv Academic Ukrainian Drama Theatre is a national theatre founded in 1935 out of remnants of the suppressed Berezil Theatre, which was founded by Les Kurbas in 1922. Kharkiv Ukrainian Drama Theatre has two stages: Main Stage (900 seats) and Small Stage "Berezil" (115 seats).

The theater's repertoire was formed by directors trained in Konstantin Stanislavsky's school, and since 1990s by directors trained by Anatoly Vasiliev. Over the years the theater's ensemble included many renowned artists such as Vadym Meller (stage designer), Leonid Bykov (actor), Amvrosy Buchma (actor, star of the film Ivan the Terrible), Andriy Zholdak (theatre director), Andrzej Szczytko (theatre director).

From 2002 to 2005,  Andriy Zholdak was the artistic director of the theatre, where he produced five plays, which, apart from Ukraine, were also presented in many European countries including Germany, France, Finland, Netherlands, Poland, Austria, Romania and Russia, at well known festivals. In 2005, after Kharkiv authorities prohibited his staging of Romeo and Juliet. A Fragment Zholdak was forced to leave the theatre.

In 2004, the theatre's ensemble was named by ITI - UNESCO critics as one of the best ensembles in Europe.

References 

Buildings and structures in Kharkiv
1935 establishments in Ukraine